Edmund Jenings (1659-1727) was a Virginia politician and lawyer who served as the colony's attorney general, on the Governor's Council and as acting governor, but encountered controversy and experienced financial problems in his final years.

Early life and education

His father Sir Edmund Jenings was a barrister and Member of Parliament from Ripon in Yorkshire, England. In the 16th century, Jenings had traditionally worked as stewards for the Barons Clifford and Earl of Cumberland. His mother Margaret was the daughter of Sir Edward Barkham, a merchant who became the lord mayor of London in 1621-1622. Edmund was their third son. His elder brother Jonathan became M.P. for Ripon, and this Edmund named his Virginia plantation "Ripon Hall". His great-grandfather Peter Jenings who died in 1651 in Silsden, Yorkshire, England was the brother of William Jenings of Silsden, whose son Capt. Peter Jenings( 1630-1672) was the second attorney general for the Virginia colony (in 1631). The Silsden Peter Jenings had three sons but both elder sons (Peter and Edmund) died unmarried and without children, in 1623 and 1624. This Edmund was descended from the third son, Jonathan, who was a barrister and who died in 1649, shortly before his father.

Career

Emigrating to Virginia when perhaps 20 years old, Jenings settled in York County near the colonial capital (which moved from Jamestown to Williamsburg during his service as discussed below). Appointed the colony's attorney general in 1680 (accounts differ as to whether Jenings arrived with a commission from Britain or a simple letter of introduction), he continued to serve until at least 1691 and possibly until 1700, with interruptions, as discussed below. Appointed to the Virginia Governor's Council in 1681, Jenings may have continued to serve until shortly before his death, although some scholars believe he was deposed during trips to Britain, and he was clearly involved in controversies during his final years.

Colonial officer to governor

In 1684-1685 Jenings accompanied Col. William Byrd, as well as Virginia Governor Lord Howard of Effingham and New York Governor Col. Thomas Dugan, as well as Ralph Wormeley Jr., Stevens V. Courtland, John Spragg and magistrates from Albany, New York in negotiations with the Seneca helped secure a treaty with the Senecas and other northern tribes. In 1696, when Wormeley was having difficulties in fulfilling his duties as the colony's secretary of state, Jenings was named his deputy. On January 1, 1702, the King's Council formally named Jenings as the Colony's secretary, but not until Wormeley's death did Jenings present his commission to the Virginia governor's council, on June 20, 1702. The following year he was given leave to go to England a second time, and as in the two previous years petitioned the House of Burgesses to receive the commissions owed him for issuing appointments as that job required. William Cocke received the royal warrant as the colonial secretary in 1712, but when Cocke died in 1720, Jenings again was appointed the colony's secretary, this time by Lt. Gov. Alexander Spotswood.

Jenings may have become a member of the Governor's Council as early as 1684, but the next April the Council ruled that if Jenings was a member of that body, he had to resign as attorney general, and no evidence exists that he did so, and in fact received some payments for his legal work. Britain revised its colonial structure and in 1696 created the Board of Trade to handle colonial relations. About the same time, the House of Burgesses decided to move the colony's capital from Jamestown (notoriously unhealthy in summers) to Williamsburg, and Jenings clearly supervised much of the transition in 1699-1700, though the capacity in which he did so is unclear. Moreover, one of his legal jobs was to compile the colony's laws for transmission to the Board of Trade, and the Speaker of the House of Burgesses found the result inadequate in 1699, and so did not appoint Jenings to that committee until one of the original committeemen (Edward Hill) died. Thus, some accounts list Jenings as becoming a councilor in 1699 or 1701. Another controversy involved whether Jenings overstayed his leave during trips to Britain, particularly an extended trip in 1704-1705 in which he met with the Board of Trade in London, or another trip in 1711 in which he met with Lady Fairfax and was named as agent for the Northern Neck Proprietary (together with Thomas Lee replacing Robert Carter from 1713 to 1719).,

Meanwhile, as the member of the Governor's Council with longest service, Jenings eventually became President of the Council of Virginia. Thus when Col. Edward Nott died in office and his successor Col. Robert Hunter was captured at sea by the French, Jenings became the acting governor from August 1706 to June 1710, but declined a second term at the end of his life citing feeble health. Jenings did not call the House of Burgesses into session during his time as acting Governor, and showed little initiative before the arrival of Gov. Alexander Spotswood.  In 1710, while lieutenant governor, Jenings became involved in a case involving two slaves who had organized a rebellion, and declared afterward that their execution "will strike such terror" in others not to rebel.

Jenings' most recent biographer details the factional strife in Virginia in the early 19th century, in which Jenings was perceived as too strenuously defending Gov. Francis Nicholson and part of a faction including Ralph Wormeley Jr. and Richard Lee II, and opposed by several powerful councilors, particularly Robert Carter, Rev. James Blair and Benjamin Harrison II. Furthermore, part of Jenings' second British trip involved not only burying his wife, but setting the estate of an elder brother, which did not yield the money Jenings expected, and needed given his borrowing from the Northern Neck proprietary accounts. In any event, when Lady Fairfax died in May 1719, her executor (re) appointed Robert Carter as the new agent, and Carter soon charged Jenings with failing to transmit the quitrents due to the proprietor in England. John Carter his son then persuaded Jenings to mortgage his lands to raise the money due to Lord Fairfax, as he informed the proprietor in 1722. Two years later, Robert Carter wrote the Fairfax representative that all Jenings' land and salves were mortgaged, and when Robert Carter died, his will (dated in 1728, after this man's death) mentioned a judgment against Jenings by the General Court in chancery. In any event, several high-ranking Virginians accused Jenings of mental illness in his final year, so he may have resigned in March 1725. Lt. Gov. Drysdale shortly after he announced that he was returning to England, removed Jenings from the council, on June 25, 1726. Thus, when Drysdale died on July 22, 1726, Robert Carter became the colony's acting governor for about a year.

Planter and land speculator

Jenings speculated in land in the Virginia colony, and also grew and shipped tobacco, using enslaved labor by at least his final years, although many records have been lost. Virginia's last colonial capital, Williamsburg, in whose platting this man had significant involvement, before becoming chartered as a town in its own right was split down main street between York County and James City County, Virginia. In 1686 Jenings was among the prominent men who asked to patent land on Pamunkey Neck (now in King William County) when such was legally available (a previous treaty with the Pamunkey having restricted resettlement), and the following year he purchased a mill on St. Andrews Creek in York County. In October 1691 Jenings patented 6,513 acres in Henrico County on Tuckahoe Creek and the James River. When the town of Yorktown was planned, about 12 miles downstream on the York River from Jenings's main Ripon Hall plantation, Jenings secured a town lot with building. The following year he was among the Council members ordered to build a house in Jamestown. In 1696 he and his wife sold land farmed by a tenant in Hampton parish (probably in Elizabeth City County. In 1706 Jenings was awarded 4,000 acres in King William County upstream of York County in recognition of his service to the crown. Thus that year Jenings paid taxes on 200 acres in James City County, 4000 acres in King William County and 1500 acres in York County.

Local offices

Among the local offices Jenings held were: the James City County sheriff in 1681, clerk of York County, one of the churchwarden of Bruton parish in 1791, and at some point probably in the early 1700s the commander in chief of the York County militia, with the rank of colonel. Jenings also grew and shipped large quantities of tobacco and was collector of customs for the James River's Upper District (which included Henrico County).

Personal life
Edmund married Frances, the daughter of Henry Corbin of Buckingham House and had several children. Frances died in London in 1713 and is likely buried at St. Clement's Dane's.  His son and grandson would also be named "Edmund Jenings" and the latter (and a daughter and her husband) would return to the mother country around the time of the American Revolutionary War and die in Yorkshire, England. His lawyer son Edmund Jr. practiced as an attorney in Baltimore County, Maryland and served as burgess for Annapolis in the Maryland General Assembly before taking a seat on the Maryland governor's council, on which he served for two decades (1732-1752). Edmund Jr also served as the provincial secretary for Maryland from 1733 until 1755, and died in 1756. Edmund Jenings Jr. married Ariana (the daughter of Mathias Vanderheyden and widow of Thomas Bordley), and their daughter Ariana married  John Randolph, the attorney general of Virginia, while their son Edmund Jenings III (this man's grandson) became a lawyer of Lincoln's Inn in London and presented a portrait of the Earl of Chatham to the Gentlemen of Westmoreland County, Virginia in 1769. This man's daughter, Elizabeth Jenings, married Robert Porteus, also returned to Yorkshire, and was the mother of Beilby Porteus, Bishop of Chester and London, although another son Edmund would become clerk of Charles County Maryland (1741-52). Two other daughters remained in Virginia: Frances who married future burgess Charles Grymes and Margaret who married Issac Hill in 1708). Their brother William Jenings also moved to Maryland. His great-grandson (grandson of Edmund Jr.) was Edmund Randolph, who became Governor of Virginia and the first Attorney General of the United States under George Washington.

Death and legacy

In early June 1726, John Randolph visited Jenings and found him suffering from a palsy, likely a stroke or Parkinson's disease, barely able to write, and composing his thoughts only with difficulty. However, when William Robertson as the council's clerk informed Jenings he was being removed for incompetence, Jenings resisted.  Various accounts of Jenings' death place it in England on December 5, 1727 (which is unlikely given that Robert Carter of Virginia wrote the Board of Trade about the death on July 24, 1727), or at Ripon Hall on June 2 or July 5. He was buried at Bruton Parish Church, which he had helped build, and modern excavation of the worn tombstone indicates a date of "Ju-- 1727".

After Jenings' death, creditor Robert Carter I foreclosed on the mortgage and took over Jenings' main Ripon Hall plantation.  Another major creditor was Thomas Corbin, his brother in law. A plaque commemorating Jenings was placed at Bruton Church in 1907, but neither his last will and testament nor other personal papers have survived.

References

17th-century births
18th-century deaths
Colonial governors of Virginia
Year of birth unknown
Year of death unknown
People from Ripon